Heubühl is a mountain in Liechtenstein in the Rätikon range of the Eastern Alps, to the east of the town of Triesen, with a height of .

References
 
 

Mountains of Liechtenstein
Mountains of the Alps